In classical Roman religion, a genius loci (plural genii locorum) was the protective spirit of a place. It was often depicted in religious iconography as a figure holding attributes such as a cornucopia, patera (libation bowl) or snake. Many Roman altars found throughout the Western Roman Empire were dedicated to a particular genius loci. The Roman imperial cults of the Emperor and the imperial house developed in part in connections with the sacrifices made by neighborhood associations (vici) to the local genius. These 265 local districts had their cult organised around the Lares Compitales (guardian spirits or lares of the crossroads), which the emperor Augustus transformed into Lares Augusti along with the Genius Augusti. The emperor's genius is then regarded as the genius loci of the Roman Empire as a whole.

Roman examples of these genii can be found, for example, at the church of St. Giles, Tockenham, Wiltshire, England, where the genius loci is depicted as a relief in the wall of a Norman church built of Roman material. This shows "a youthful and curly-haired Roman Genius worked in high relief, holding a cornucopia in his left hand and a patera in his right", which previously has been "erroneously identified as Asclepius".

Asian usage
The numinous spirits of places in Asia are still honored today in city pillar shrines, outdoor spirit houses and indoor household and business shrines.

Western usage
In contemporary usage, genius loci usually refers to a location's distinctive atmosphere, or a "spirit of the place", rather than necessarily a guardian spirit. An example of contemporary usage might be along the lines of "Light reveals the genius loci of a place."

Art and architecture
Alexander Pope made the genius loci an important principle in garden and landscape design with the following lines from Epistle IV, to Richard Boyle, Earl of Burlington:

Pope's verse laid the foundation for one of the most widely agreed principles of landscape architecture, that landscape designs should always be adapted to the context in which they are located.

A priori, archetype, and genius loci are the primary principals of Neo-Rationalism or New Rationalism. Pioneered by the Italian architect Aldo Rossi, Neo-Rationalism developed in the light of a re-evaluation of the work of Giuseppe Terragni, and gained momentum through the work of Giorgio Grassi. Characterized by elemental vernacular forms and an adaptation to the existing environment, the Neo-Rationalist style has adherents beyond architecture in the greater world of art.

In the context of modern architectural theory, genius loci has profound implications for place-making, falling within the philosophical branch of phenomenology. This field of architectural discourse is explored most notably by the theorist Christian Norberg-Schulz in his book, Genius Loci: Towards a Phenomenology of Architecture.

Modern fantasy
Adaptations of the original concept of the genius loci appear in some works of modern fantasy.

Tom Bombadil in The Lord of the Rings has been described by Tolkien scholar Tom Shippey as the genius loci of the Old Forest, a wooded land bordering the Shire. 

In the Dungeons and Dragons 3.0 edition book the Epic Level Handbook, the genius loci is a malign, powerful ooze that mimics the landscape and has no intelligence of its own. It can magically enslave a visitor, whose mind affects the genius loci's behaviour. It is spontaneously generated when a place is undisturbed for a long time.

In The Dresden Files, a genius loci is an elemental spirit of a place. The island of Demonreach has its own genius loci, also named Demonreach, which is omniscient with regards to its own island. Wizards can form a spiritual connection with a genius loci and the place it represents.

The Rivers of London series of novels by Ben Aaronovitch feature many beings described as genii locorum, primarily those of the River Thames and its tributaries.

See also
 Cheng Huang Gong (City God), Chinese official urban equivalent
 Jinn
 Kami
 Landvættir
 Seonangshin, Korean equivalent
 Shekhinah
 Spirit house
 Tomte
 Tuatha Dé Danann
 Tu Di Gong (Earth Deity), Chinese locality equivalent
 Tutelary deity
 Zashiki-warashi
 Zeitgeist

References

Further reading

External links

 Essay on the Genius loci in landscape and garden design
 Photographs of St. Giles, Tockenham, Wiltshire

Ancient Roman religion
Geography terminology
Landscape design history
Psychogeography
Roman deities
Roman legendary creatures
Tutelary deities